Live at Roadburn (subtitled Eulogy for the Late Sixties) is a live album by Norwegian experimental collective Ulver. Produced by Ulver, the album was recorded at the Roadburn Festival, held at 013, Tilburg, in the Netherlands on 12 April 2012, and issued in April 2013 via Roadburn Records.

Rygg commented on the release, "This was our pre-release party for the commemorative album Childhood's End, which we had just sewn up when we received the invitation from Roadburn. A one-shot psychedelic blowout or perhaps some sort of karaoke for our vestigial veterans; felt quite invigorating after the doom and gloom of the last few years. We gathered the guys who were involved in the album sessions and rehearsed the songs a couple of days before travelling to Tilburg. Not in total control, but that’s the spirit. Haywire lycanthropy."

Commenting on Ulver's performance at Roadburn Festival, Jamie Thomson, writing for The Quietus, said, "I was placing a lot of faith in Ulver but ultimately I was to be disappointed. They were playing set of '60s psyche covers – and while the band themselves had a pretty good stab at recreating the sounds of the time, the alchemical tools to make it something special seemed just out of frontman Kristoffer Rygg's reach. Ulver's restless reinvention is rarely less than compelling, so it was unusual to see their ambitions outstrip their ability."

Track listing

Personnel 

Live band
Drums – Tomas Pettersen
Electric bass – Mats Engen
Electric guitar – Alexander Kloster-Jensen, Trond Mjøen
Organ, Mellotron, electric piano – Daniel O'Sullivan
Percussion – Anders Møller
Voice, guitar – Daniel O'Sullivan (tracks: 7)
Voice, effects, percussion – Kristoffer Rygg

Other credits
Cover – Trine + Kim Design Studio
Engineer (FOH) – Chris Fullard, Kristin Bøyesen
Mastering – Jaime Gomez Arellano
Mixing – Anders Møller
Photography – Christian Westgeest, Paul Verhagen
Producer – Marcel van de Vondervoort, Robert de Lorijn
Recording – Danny Gras, Kristian Vloet

References

Ulver albums
2013 live albums
Live psychedelic rock albums